is a Japanese footballer who plays for Verspah Oita as a defender.

Club statistics
Updated to 23 December 2018.

Honours
 Blaublitz Akita
 J3 League (1): 2017

References

External links

Profile at Blaublitz Akita

1988 births
Living people
Association football people from Shiga Prefecture
Japanese footballers
J3 League players
Japan Football League players
MIO Biwako Shiga players
AC Nagano Parceiro players
SP Kyoto FC players
FC Ryukyu players
Blaublitz Akita players
Association football defenders